Muramatsu Flute is a flute manufacturer founded by Koichi Muramatsu. It is probably the oldest Japanese flute company, having manufactured the instrument since 1923. Their handmade flutes are made from sterling silver; 9K, 14K, 18K, and 24K gold; as well as platinum. Many artisans who have worked for Muramatsu have also created many of the new companies in Japan that make high-quality handmade flutes.

The factory  is located in the city of Tokorozawa, Japan.

Famous flautists who use this brand include James Galway, Sharon Bezaly, and Lizzo.

References

External links
 

Flute makers
Tokorozawa, Saitama
Companies based in Saitama Prefecture
Musical instrument manufacturing companies of Japan
Japanese brands